Giambattista Costaguti (1636–1704) was a Catholic cardinal from 1690 to 1704.

Biography

Giambattista Costaguti was born in Rome in 1636, the son of Prospero Costaguti, marquis of Sipicciano (a member of the Genoese nobility) and of his second wife Rocca Elvezia, Countess Vidman. He was the younger half-brother of Vincenzo Costaguti, who became a cardinal in 1643.

Costaguti entered the church as a young man, serving as a clerk in the Apostolic Camera, and rising to become its dean in 1669.

In the consistory of 13 February 1690, Pope Alexander VIII made him a cardinal priest.  On 10 April 1690 he received the red hat and the titular church of San Bernardo alle Terme.  He participated in the papal conclave of 1691 that elected Pope Innocent XII.  He opted for the titular church of Sant'Anastasia on 12 November 1691.  He later participated in the papal conclave of 1700 that elected Pope Clement XI.

He died on 8 March 1704 and is buried in San Carlo ai Catinari.

References

1636 births
1704 deaths
18th-century Italian cardinals
Cardinals created by Pope Alexander VIII
17th-century Italian cardinals
Clergy from Rome